The Beaurivage River is a tributary of the Chaudière River which in turn flows into the St. Lawrence River.

The Beaurivage river crosses the Quebec municipalities (in Canada) of:
 MRC Robert-Cliche Regional County Municipality: municipality of Saint-Séverin;
 MRC La Nouvelle-Beauce Regional County Municipality: municipality of Saint-Elzéar;
 MRC of Lotbinière Regional County Municipality: municipalities of Saint-Sylvestre, Saint-Patrice-de-Beaurivage and Saint-Gilles;
 Lévis, a city.

The Beaurivage River is a river in Quebec that flows from Thetford Mines and empties in the Chaudière River, near Saint-Romuald, Quebec.  It is a body of water mostly known for its annual canoe race beginning at Saint-Patrice-de-Beaurivage, Quebec and finishing at Saint-Gilles, Quebec.

Geography 
The main neighboring watersheds of the Beaurivage river are:
 north side: Chaudière River, St. Lawrence River;
 east side: Chaudière River, Cugnet River, Bras d'Henri;
 south side: Fourchette River, Saint-André River, Armagh River, Filkars River, Palmer River;
 west side: Noire River, Rouge River, Du Chêne River, Henri River.

The Beaurivage river is a river of Quebec, whose sources begin on the heights which crown the township of Broughton, (MRC Les Appalaches Regional County Municipality), in the part East of the municipality of Saint-Sylvestre, almost at the limit of Saint-Séverin. This head area is located east of Mont Handkerchief, south-east of Mont Sainte-Marguerite, south of Mont Saint-André and west of the village of Saint-Séverin.

Its course crosses several marshy sectors and draws many meanders. It receives the Bras d'Henri at the height of Saint-Gilles, then makes a bend in an easterly direction, which allows it to water Saint-Étienne-de-Lauzon and join the Chaudière River a few kilometers before the falls, near Saint-Rédempteur.

Toponymy 
The name of the river and its use merge with that of the seigneury of Saint-Gilles or of Beaurivage granted in 1738 to Gilles Rageot, sieur de Beaurivage. Several parishes and municipalities have retained, officially or in custom, the name of the river in their designation: Saint-Séverin, Saint-Gilles-de-Beaurivage, Saint-Patrice-de-Beaurivage, Saint-Narcisse-de-Beaurivage, Saint-Sylvestre-de-Beaurivage.

The toponym Rivière Beaurivage was formalized on December 5, 1968, at the Commission de toponymie du Québec.

See also 

 List of rivers of Quebec

Notes and references 

Rivers of Chaudière-Appalaches
Lévis, Quebec
Lotbinière Regional County Municipality